François Lamy may refer to:

 Amédée-François Lamy (1858–1900), French colonial soldier
 François Lamy (theologian) (1636–1711), French Benedictine ascetical and apologetic writer
 François Lamy (politician) (born 1959), French politician